María San Gil Noain (born 15 January 1965, in San Sebastián) is a Spanish Basque politician. 

Born in San Sebastián, San Gil graduated with a degree in Trilingual Biblical Philology from the Universidad Pontificia de Salamanca. In 1991 she began working for the San Sebastián city council, representing the conservative Partido Popular. On January 23, 1995 she witnessed the assassination of her colleague Gregorio Ordóñez by the Basque separatist group ETA, and thereafter decided that she would spend her political career fighting terrorism.

Rising steadily in prominence, in 2003 she became the leader of the Partido Popular's regional representation in the Basque Country. In the regional elections of 2005 she was a candidate for Basque regional president or lehendakari, but lost out to the nationalist candidate Juan Jose Ibarretxe of the EAJ-PNV.

On April 18, 2007 she announced that she had been diagnosed with breast cancer and had already been operated on once. On May 21, 2008 after a meeting with Mariano Rajoy she informed him of her intention to resign from the leadership position in the regional representation of the Partido Popular.

San Gil is married and has two children.

References

1965 births
21st-century Spanish politicians
21st-century Spanish women politicians
Living people
Members of the 7th Basque Parliament
Members of the 8th Basque Parliament
People's Party (Spain) politicians
Recipients of the Order of Constitutional Merit
Pontifical University of Salamanca alumni
Politicians from San Sebastián
Basque women in politics
Women members of the Basque Parliament
Municipal councillors in the Basque Country (autonomous community)